Reme Lala (born 29 September 1995) is an Albanian Party for Justice, Integration and Unity politician and the Member of Parliament (MP) for Dibër.

Belonging to the Party for Justice, Integration and Unity (PDIU), she was elected from Dibër.

References 

1995 births
Living people
Party for Justice, Integration and Unity politicians
21st-century Albanian politicians
Members of the Parliament of Albania
Women members of the Parliament of Albania
21st-century Albanian women politicians